Paykullia is a genus of flies in the family Rhinophoridae.

Species
Species within this genus include:
P. braueri (Strobl, 1895)
P. brevicornis (Zetterstedt, 1844)
P. carmela (Peris, 1963)
P. florentina (Rondani, 1861)
P. insularis (Villeneuve, 1911)
P. kugleri (Herting, 1961)
P. liturata (Loew, 1847)
P. maculata (Fallén, 1815)
P. nubilipennis (Loew, 1847)
P. partenopea (Rondani, 1861)

References

Schizophora genera
Rhinophoridae
Brachyceran flies of Europe